Peeter Tooming (1 June 1939 Rakvere – 17 May 1997 Tallinn) was an Estonian photographer, photojournalist, documentary film director and journalist.

In 1974 he graduated from Tartu State University in journalism. From 1961 until 1994, he was an operator and director at Tallinnfilm.

He organised over 120 photo exhibitions, and he participated on over 300 international photo exhibitions. He was one of the founders of photoartist collectives "Stodom" (1964) and "O" (1985).

Awards:
 1988: Estonian SSR merited artistic personnel

Filmography

 Koduküla (1969, with Peep Puks)
 Aastad (1977)
 Kitseküla (1993)

Gallery

References

1939 births
1997 deaths
Estonian photographers
Estonian journalists
Estonian film directors
Estonian documentary filmmakers
Estonian photojournalists
University of Tartu alumni
people from Rakvere
Burials at Metsakalmistu